The Golden Pendant, is an Australian Turf Club Group 2 Thoroughbred horserace for fillies and mares aged three years old and upwards with set weights with penalties conditions over a distance of 1400 metres, held annually at Rosehill Racecourse, Sydney, Australia in September. Total prizemoney for the race is A$400,000.

History

Name
Originally this race was run as the Research Stakes in honour of 1988-89 Australian Horse of the Year, Research who won the AJC Derby, AJC Oaks, Flight Stakes, VRC Oaks.
In 2011 the race was renamed to the Golden Pendant.

Grade
 1998–2000 - Listed race
 2001–2014 - Group 3 
 2015 onwards - Group 2

Distance
 1996–2011 - 1200 metres
 2012 onwards - 1400 metres

Winners

 2022 - Nimalee
 2021 - Vangelic
 2020 - Subpoenaed
 2019 - Mizzy
 2018 - Shumookh
 2017 - Dayses Doom
 2016 - Tycoon Tara
 2015 - Peeping
 2014 - Arabian Gold
 2013 - Sharnee Rose
 2012 - More Joyous
 2011 - Screen
 2010 - Trim
 2009 - Hot Danish
 2008 - Judged
 2007 - race not held
 2006 - Coolroom Candidate
 2005 - Fumble
 2004 - Besame Mucho
 2003 - Classy Dane
 2002 - Mica's Pride
 2001 - La Rieuse
 2000 - Spinning Hill
 1999 - Brief Kiss
 1998 - Dantelah
 1997 - Unison
 1996 - Fiddlestick

See also
 List of Australian Group races
 Group races

References

Horse races in Australia